"Maybe" is a single from American band N*E*R*D's second studio album, Fly or Die (2004). The song features Lenny Kravitz on guitar and Questlove on drums. It peaked at number 25 in the United Kingdom, number 31 in Ireland, and number 34 in the Netherlands. The song was featured in an iPod commercial that also promoted the song.

A "Maybe" remix was released a year later in 2005 on rap duo Clipse's "We Got It 4 Cheap, Volume 2" mixtape. The song is a stylistic departure from the original song. The remix features Pharrell rapping over Outkast's "Elevators (Me & You)" instrumental.

Track listings

UK CD1 and European CD single
 "Maybe" (radio edit) – 3:30
 "She Wants to Move" (Native Tongue remix) – 4:44

UK CD2
 "Maybe" (radio edit) – 3:30
 "She Wants to Move" (Native Tongue remix) – 4:44
 "She Wants to Move" (Basement Jaxx remix) – 5:12
 "Maybe" (live) – 4:24
 "Maybe" (video) – 3:30

UK 12-inch single
 "Maybe" (radio edit) – 3:30
 "Maybe" (SA-RA remix) – 3:31
 "She Wants to Move" (Basement Jaxx remix) – 5:12
 "She Wants to Move" (Native Tongue remix) – 4:44

Australian CD single
 "Maybe" (radio edit) – 3:30
 "She Wants to Move" (Native Tongue remix) – 4:44
 "Maybe" (live) – 3:30

Personnel
 Pharrell Williams – lead vocals, production
 Chad Hugo – keyboards, production
 Shae Haley – bass, backing vocals, keyboards, production
 Lenny Kravitz, Michael Landau – guitars
 Questlove (The Roots) – drums

Charts

Release history

References

2004 singles
2004 songs
Music videos directed by Paul Hunter (director)
N.E.R.D. songs
Song recordings produced by the Neptunes
Songs written by Chad Hugo
Songs written by Pharrell Williams
Virgin Records singles